Oksen Ourfalian also spelled Oxen, was a Lebanese footballer who played as a forward.

Club career 
Ourfalian played for Homenetmen Beirut in Lebanon in 1940, before moving to Palestine at Homenetmen Jerusalem in 1942.

International career 
Ourfalian took part in Lebanon's first international match against Mandatory Palestine in 1940.

References

External links
 

Year of birth missing
Year of death missing
Lebanese people of Armenian descent
Ethnic Armenian sportspeople
Association football forwards
Association football inside forwards
Lebanese footballers
Homenetmen Beirut footballers
Al Shabiba Mazraa Beirut players
Lebanese Premier League players
Lebanon international footballers
Lebanese expatriate footballers
Expatriate footballers in Mandatory Palestine
Lebanese expatriate sportspeople in Mandatory Palestine